Tangail-3 is a constituency represented in the Jatiya Sangsad (National Parliament) of Bangladesh since 2019 by Ataur Rahman Khan of the Awami League.

Boundaries 
The constituency encompasses Ghatail Upazila.

History 
The constituency was created for the first general elections in newly independent Bangladesh, held in 1973.

Members of Parliament

Elections

Elections in the 2010s 
Amanur Rahman Khan Rana was re-elected unopposed in the 2014 general election after opposition parties withdrew their candidacies in a boycott of the election.

Matiur Rahman died in September 2012. Independent candidate Amanur Rahman Khan Rana was elected in a November 2012 by-election.

Elections in the 2000s

Elections in the 1990s

References

External links
 

Parliamentary constituencies in Bangladesh
Tangail District